Donald Neilson (born Donald Nappey; 1 August 1936 – 18 December 2011), alias the "Black Panther," was an English armed robber, kidnapper and murderer. From 1971, he committed a series of robberies of sub-post offices; in 1974, Neilson killed three men during these robberies. In 1975, he kidnapped Lesley Whittle, an heiress from Highley, Shropshire, who died in his captivity. He was arrested later that year, convicted of four counts of murder, and sentenced to life imprisonment in July 1976. Neilson remained in prison until his death in 2011.

Early life
Neilson, born Donald Nappey, was aged ten in January 1947, when his 33-year-old mother died from breast cancer. He was said to have had an unhappy childhood, and was caught shopbreaking in 1948. Due to his age and circumstances, Neilson was given a police caution or stern warning. In April 1955, an 18-year-old Neilson married 20-year-old Irene Tate. In 1958, his wife persuaded him to leave the army, following a period as a national serviceman in Kenya, Aden and Cyprus as part of the King's Own Yorkshire Light Infantry.

Their daughter, Kathryn, was born in 1960. Four years after his daughter's birth, Nappey changed the family name to "Neilson," so that the child would not suffer the bullying and abuse he had endured at school and in the army because of his surname’s similarity to the word nappy.

According to David Bell and Harry Hawkes, Nappey bought a taxi business from a man named Neilson, and decided to use that name instead of the former. An alternative theory, proposed by a lodger, Lena Fearnley, who stayed with the Neilson family in the early 1960s, is that Neilson took the name from an ice-cream van (carrying the brand name "Lord Neilson"), from which he and Irene often bought ice-cream for their daughter. Fearnley told the BBC in an interview that he told her, "I like that name."

Burglary and robbery
Neilson committed over 400 house burglaries without detection during his early days of crime. Before he became notorious as the "Black Panther," he was sought under a variety of nicknames, such as "The Phantom" and "Handy Andy." To confuse the police, he adopted a different modus operandi every few weeks. For example: he would steal a radio from each house, and abandon it nearby; when that pattern of behaviour was established, he would drop it, and do something else.

Proceeds from simple housebreakings were low, however, and after stealing guns and ammunition from a house in Cheshire, he upped his criminal activity, turning to robbing small post offices. Neilson committed eighteen such crimes between 1971 and 1974. His crimes became progressively more violent as he sought to protect himself from occupants prepared to resist and defend their property.

In February 1972, he gained entry during the night to a sub-post office located in a private home in Rochdale Road, Heywood, Lancashire. Leslie Richardson, the postmaster, and his wife woke to find a hooded man in their bedroom. Richardson leapt out of bed to tackle the intruder while his wife phoned the police. During the struggle, Neilson showed Richardson his sawn-off shotgun and warned, in a fake West Indian accent, "This is loaded." Richardson saw that the gun was pointing up at the ceiling, and realized that there was no danger of anyone being shot.

Richardson rejoined, "We'll find out if it's loaded!" and pulled the trigger himself, blasting two holes in the ceiling. The fight continued, and Richardson pulled off Neilson's black hood. Neilson stamped on Richardson's feet, breaking several toes, and kneed him in the groin. As Richardson collapsed on the floor, Neilson made his escape empty-handed. Richardson gave police a description of the masked intruder, which turned out to be inaccurate in many respects. Several other photofits of Neilson were similarly unhelpful to the police, but one, made by sub-postmistress Margaret Grayland, was extremely accurate.

First murders
Neilson committed his first three murders in 1974. During post office robberies, he shot dead two sub-postmasters and the husband of a sub-postmistress, as well as brutally battering sub-postmistress Margaret Grayland. He killed Donald Skepper in Harrogate in North Yorkshire in February 1974, Derek Astin of Baxenden in Lancashire in September 1974, and Sidney Grayland in Langley, West Midlands during November 1974.

The Baxenden murder resulted in Neilson being dubbed the "Black Panther," as, during an interview with a local television reporter, Astin's wife, Marion, described her husband's killer as being "so quick, he was like a panther." Alluding to the killer's dark clothing, the enterprising reporter ended his piece by asking, "Where is this Black Panther?" and the nickname stuck. Neilson was linked to the post office shootings after he shot security guard Gerald Smith six times while checking a ransom trail. Forensic examination showed the bullets were fired from the same .22 LR pistol used to murder both Astin and Grayland.

Kidnap and murder of Lesley Whittle

Lesley Whittle (1957–14 January 1975) was a 17-year-old girl when she became Neilson's youngest victim. Whittle was the daughter of noted coach transport business owner George Whittle and his mistress. Whittle had left his entire fortune to his mistress and their children, Ronald and Lesley. After reading about a family dispute over George Whittle's will, Neilson planned for three years to gain some of this fortune.

On 14 January 1975, Neilson entered the Whittle family home in Highley, Shropshire, and kidnapped Lesley from her bedroom. Neilson calculated that the family would not materially miss £50,000 of their fortune, and so made a subsequent demand for that sum in a note left at the family home. A series of police bungles and other circumstances resulted in Whittle’s brother, Ronald, being unable to deliver the ransom money at the designated time and place demanded by the kidnapper.

Lesley Whittle's body was found on 7 March 1975, hanging from a wire at the bottom of the drainage shaft where he had tethered her in Bathpool Park, at Kidsgrove, Staffordshire. The subsequent post-mortem examination showed that Whittle had died from vagal inhibition, not from strangulation. The shock of the fall had caused her heart to stop.

Some analysts thought it was possible Neilson pushed Whittle off the ledge where he had kept her. An alternative scenario is that Neilson was not present when Whittle died, and that he had panicked and fled on the night of the failed ransom collection without returning to the shaft, believing the police were closing in on him. Whittle may have lived in the dark for a considerable period of time before she fell to her death. The pathologist noted that Whittle weighed only  when found, her stomach and intestines were completely empty, she had lost a considerable amount of weight, and was emaciated. He concluded that she had not eaten for a minimum of three days, the length of time it takes for food to pass through the body, but said the actual duration may have been much longer.

In his closing speech for the defence, Gilbert Gray QC described the conditions that Neilson provided for Whittle, noting ways that he tried to provide for her comfort. For instance, he asked the jury whether they believed any hangman's noose would be padded and lagged with 77½ inches of Elastoplast to avoid chafing, or that any scaffold would be cushioned for comfort by a rubber mattress and sleeping bags. He noted that Whittle would not have died if the wire had not snagged on a stanchion, because her feet were only six inches from the bottom of the shaft, the QC clarified: 
"This is not something the defence has made up. Her height from the neck was four feet, and there was a five feet length of ligature, giving an overall length of nine feet. The drop from the landing to the floor of the tunnel was six feet eleven inches, so that if it had not been for the unforeseen snagging which shortened the tether, there would have been two feet to spare, and she would have landed on her feet at the bottom of the shaft."

The QC asked the jury why Neilson bothered to keep her alive once he had recorded the ransom messages, arguing he could have simply clubbed her to death, and hidden the body in woodland. Gray finished his speech by opining, "I submit that when Lesley Whittle went over the platform, it was an unlooked for misadventure, unplanned and undesired. Neilson started something that went hideously wrong."

Capture and arrest
In December 1975, two police officers, Tony White and Stuart Mackenzie, were in a panda car in a side road, keeping a watch on the main A60 trunk road that led out of Mansfield in North Nottinghamshire, when they spotted a small, wiry man carrying a holdall walking alongside the road. As he passed the police car, he averted his face, drawing Mackenzie’s attention. As a matter of routine, they called him over to question him. The man answered that he was on his way home from work, but then produced a sawn-off shotgun from the holdall. He ordered White into the back of the car, and the policeman complied and opened the car door. However, the gunman rapidly grew impatient and snapped, "No time for that, climb the seat!" The officer did so, and the gunman settled into the passenger seat, jamming the gun into Mackenzie’s armpit.

The assailant ordered them to drive to Rainworth, six miles away, and commanded them not to look at him. This presented Mackenzie with a problem. Gently, he explained to the gunman that they were going the wrong way, and he would have to turn the car around. The gunman agreed, but warned both officers that if there were any tricks, they would both be dead. As they were driving along Southwell Road, the gunman asked if they had any rope.

As White pretended to look, Mackenzie reached a junction in the road, and seized upon an opportunity to disorient the carjacker. Turning the steering wheel violently one way then the other, he asked, "Which way, left or right?" causing the gunman to look towards the road ahead. White saw the gun drop a few inches, and realised this was his chance; he pushed the gun forwards, and Mackenzie stamped on the brake. They screeched to a halt outside the 'Junction Chip Shop' in Rainworth. The gun went off, grazing White's hand. Mackenzie fell out of the driver’s seat, banging his head on the road. He staggered to his feet, and ran towards the fish and chip shop screaming for help.

Two men, Roy Morris and Keith Wood, ran from the queue outside the chip shop, and helped overpower Neilson. Wood subdued the gunman with a blow to the neck before Morris grabbed his wrists, and held them for White to snap on the handcuffs. The locals attacked him so severely that in the end, the police had to protect him. They hauled Neilson to iron railings at the side of a bus stop, and handcuffed him there before calling for back-up.

In the subsequent investigation, Neilson's fingerprints were found to match one of those in the drain shaft. In the interview at Kidsgrove police station, when he confessed to the kidnap of Whittle, Neilson gave an 18-page statement to DCS Harold Wright, head of Staffordshire CID, and Commander Morrison of Scotland Yard, with the statement handwritten by DCI Walter Boreham.

Trial and conviction

During Neilson's trial at Oxford Crown Court, his defence lawyer, Gilbert Gray QC, contended that Whittle had accidentally fallen from the ledge, and died as a result. He noted that Neilson had fed her chicken soup, spaghetti and meatballs, and bought her fish and chips, chicken legs, and Polo mints. The prosecution contested these claims. Evidence showed that Neilson had provided his victim with a sleeping bag designed to prevent hypothermia, mattresses, survival blankets, survival bags, a bottle of brandy, six paperback books, a copy of the Times and two magazines for reading, a small puzzle, and two brightly-coloured napkins. These items were found in the shaft, and in the subterranean canal running below it, by the police.

In July 1976, Neilson was convicted of the kidnapping and murder of Lesley Whittle, for which he was given a life sentence. Three weeks later, he was convicted of the murders of two postmasters and the husband of a postmistress. In total, Neilson received five life sentences. The judge, Mr Justice Mars-Jones, also gave Neilson a further 61 years: 21 years for kidnapping Lesley Whittle, and 10 years for blackmailing her mother. Three further sentences of 10 years each were imposed for the two burglary charges, when he stole guns and ammunition, and for possessing the sawn-off shotgun with intent to endanger life.

All the sentences were to run concurrently. The judge told Neilson that the enormity of his crimes put him in a class apart from almost all other convicted murderers in recent years. Neilson's defence team, solicitor, Barrington Black, junior counsel, Norman Jones, and leading counsel, Gilbert Gray, all claimed that his conviction was a reflection of public opinion, a backlash of the publicity given to the hunt for the kidnapper and killer, and that he should have been convicted only of the lesser charge of manslaughter.

Neilson was acquitted of the attempted murders of sub-postmistress Margaret Grayland and PC Tony White, but found guilty of the lesser alternative charges of inflicting grievous bodily harm on Mrs. Grayland, and of possessing a shotgun with the intent of endangering life at Mansfield. A charge of attempting to murder security guard Gerald Smith, whom Neilson shot six times while checking the Whittle ransom trail, was not pursued due to legal complications. Smith died more than a year and a day after being shot. The trial judge recommended that Neilson receive a whole life tariff. After the verdicts, Gray visited his client in a cell below the courthouse, and found Neilson in the corner of his cell, curled up in a foetal position, purportedly dejected, and allegedly filled with remorse for Whittle and her family.

Trial and conviction of Irene Neilson
According to Harry Hawkes, when Donald Neilson was first caught in Mansfield, his wife, Irene, became worried when he failed to return home. Irene burned around fifty postal orders in their coal fire. Police noticed the charred remains within the chimney when the house was later searched. Irene Neilson was later convicted of cashing over eighty stolen postal orders that had come from one of her husband's post office raids.

She claimed to have been forced into cashing these items in various post offices over a large area. Her solicitor, Barrington Black, placed the blame squarely on Donald Neilson’s complete domination of his wife, describing him as a "Svengali, who had exercised a hypnotic influence." Black added, "He was a quasi-military figure who barked orders at his wife and daughter, and woe betide anyone who disobeyed him."

The solicitor said he felt this portrayal was confirmed by Donald Neilson when he had visited him in his top security cell. It seemed a formality that Irene, then aged 42 with no previous convictions, would be placed on probation, but a court report said that probation would not be suitable. Black pressed hard for Irene Neilson to be fined, asking the magistrates if she really deserved to be harshly treated for a situation that was forced upon her, and insisted her last three years with Neilson before his arrest had been "hell." The magistrates responded that while they had every sympathy with a lady before the courts for the first time, they regarded her activities as a deliberate course of conduct. She received twelve months in prison per official court records. An appeal was immediately lodged.

Gilbert Gray QC was briefed to represent her, and he produced Donald Neilson as a surprise witness. The QC told the judge, sitting with two magistrates, that he was anxious that the court should be aware of the pressure and constraints placed upon Mrs. Neilson as a result of her husband. Gray described how Neilson "was the man who struck fear and dread into pretty much the whole community, and this woman lived with him." However, the judges found Donald Neilson's testimony to have a "vagueness," and they upheld his wife's conviction and sentence.

While Irene was in prison, a major newspaper paid a large amount for the Neilsons' story. Six years later, in an interview with The Sunday People, Irene Neilson claimed that she doubted she would have been jailed had she not been Neilson's wife. She said everyone had wanted blood after her husband's trial. In the event, she served eight months before being released with full remission for good behaviour.

2008 appeal for Neilson
Following subsequent legal judgements in various other cases, and the implications of European Union Human Rights laws, Neilson was confirmed on numerous occasions to be on the Home Office's list of prisoners with whole life tariffs. A succession of Home Secretaries ruled that life should mean life for Neilson. In 2008, Neilson applied to the High Court to have his minimum term reverted to 30 years. On 12 June 2008, Mr. Justice Teare upheld the whole life tariff, and imparted:

Death
In the early hours of 17 December 2011, Neilson was taken from Norwich Prison to Norfolk and Norwich University Hospital with breathing difficulties. He was pronounced dead the next day.

In popular culture
Neilson’s life and crimes were portrayed in the 1977 film The Black Panther, starring Donald Sumpter as Neilson. It was released on DVD in 2012.

A fictionalised account of the Whittle kidnapping and Neilson's trial forms the basis of Adam Mars-Jones's short-story "Bathpool Park," which attempted to show how the court and judge had "missed the point." Mars-Jones's father, Sir William Mars-Jones, presided over the trial, and Adam Mars-Jones served as his father's marshal.

A television documentary titled The Abduction of Lesley Whittle explores her abduction and murder by Neilson, and was aired on UK television by Channel 5 on 11 October 2021.

References

Further reading

 Valentine, Steven (1976). The Black Panther story. London: New English Library 450 03099 7

External links
Crime & Investigation Network feature
"Audio slideshow: Lesley Whittle remembered ", BBC Shropshire website

1936 births
2011 deaths
20th-century British Army personnel
20th-century English criminals
British people convicted of burglary
British people convicted of kidnapping
British people who died in prison custody
British robbers
Criminals from Yorkshire
Deaths from motor neuron disease
English male criminals
English murderers of children
English people convicted of murder
English prisoners sentenced to life imprisonment
King's Own Yorkshire Light Infantry soldiers
Neurological disease deaths in England
People convicted of murder by England and Wales
Prisoners sentenced to life imprisonment by England and Wales